Boaz Dvir (born June 23, 1967) is an Israeli-American professor, journalist, and filmmaker. His main work includes documentaries, most recently Jessie's Dad, Discovering Gloria, and A Wing and a Prayer.

Background 
Filmmaker and Penn State assistant professor Boaz Dvir tells the stories of ordinary people who, under extraordinary circumstances, transform into trailblazers and game changers. For instance, his PBS film, A Wing and a Prayer, recounts a World War II flight engineer's transformation into the leader of a secret operation to save newborn Israel.

Dvir grew up in Kfar Galim, a village in Israel, and moved to New Jersey when his father worked for the U.N. The family later moved to Florida and Dvir attended the University of Florida, where he earned a bachelor's degree in journalism and an MFA in creative photography. He also earned a master's from the UF Documentary Institute.

He would serve as an officer and military journalist for the Israel Defense Force during The Gulf War in 1991,  providing material to foreign correspondents, James Baker's office and then Israeli spokesman and current Prime Minister Benjamin Netanyahu. Dvir's grandfather, a holocaust survivor, had fought in the 1948 Arab–Israeli War, and his experiences would have an influence on Dvir's work. “It really started as an interview with my grandfather. At that time I wasn’t even making documentaries."

He has written for many publications, including Newsday, The South Florida Sun-Sentinel, The Tampa Bay Times,the Philadelphia Inquirer, The Miami Herald, the Las Vegas Sun, The Satirist, Scripps Howard's Treasure Coast Newspapers, the Times of Israel, Explore Magazine and The Jerusalem Post. Dvir served as editor of the Jacksonville Business Journal and managing editor of the South Florida Business Journal, which are part of Newhouse's American City Business Journals. For several years, he appeared on “Week in Review” and wrote commentaries for WJCT, Jacksonville's NPR/PBS station.

Dvir has won six Florida Magazine Association awards, including first place for his communigator column. He also won numerous awards from the Florida Press Association, including first place for his Business Journal column.

Dvir's films have won several prestigious awards. For instance, A Wing and a Prayer won Best Documentary in the 2016 Fort Lauderdale International Film Festival.

He lectured at the University of Florida for ten years, and while there, directed and produced a DVD of documentary shorts to Professor Nancy Dana's inquiry book Digging Deeper into Action Research. He is currently an assistant professor at Penn State University.

Dvir is in post-production on Cojot, a feature documentary that tells the story of a French banker who set out to kill former Nazi officer Klaus Barbie and ended up playing a pivotal role in Israel's 1976 Operation Entebbe; and Discovering Gloria, about an inner-city schoolteacher who becomes a highly effective innovator and national model.

Dvir's critically acclaimed films also include Jessie's Dad, which captures an uneducated truck driver's transformation into a national child-protection activist.

Dvir teamed up with Retro Report to produce a short documentary, “How Special Ops Became Central to the War On Terror,” for The New York Times.

Lifetime and Investigation Discovery have incorporated footage from Dvir's documentaries into their programs. His films have received coverage by such media as the Huffington Post, Haaretz, MSNBC, the New York Post, The Miami Herald, Stars and Stripes, the Los Angeles Jewish Journal, the Jewish Telegraphic Agency and Florida magazine.

Dvir created a documentary short about PALS, which helped the nonprofit that aids troubled teens receive an official nomination for a Nobel Peace Prize and raise hundreds of thousands of dollars in grants.

Dvir received a Lilly Endowment grant from the Religion News Service to research spiritual aspects of the Holocaust.

Published Jan, 31, 2020 by Rowman and Littlefield, Dvir’s Saving Israel: The Unknown Story of Smuggling Weapons and Winning a Nation’s Independence tells the story of a secret, illegal operation by World War II aviators to save newborn Israel in 1948. In this critically acclaimed, 320-page nonfiction book, Dvir elaborates on his PBS documentary, A Wing and a Prayer.

The book was extremely well received with reviews from various outlets including, the Washington Times, the Jerusalem Post, and the Times of Israel. Defense and Foreign affairs author Geogery R. Copley also reviewed the book saying “The book, written in a journalistic style, tells a tale which not only is educational about the formation of Israel and the age into which it was born, but about the role which innovation and creativity can play in the saving of any society during a period of existential crisis. It is about how people discover their identity—which is usually in times of crisis—and how they can act to preserve that identity to create anew.” Other reviewers include Thomas Van Hare (Historic Wings), Ralph Lowenstein (University of Florida College of Journalism), Miriam Elman (Syracuse University), Barbara Dury (former “60 Minutes” producer), and Richard Shyrock (Virginia Tech) Additionally, in September 2020, Saving Israel was named number 5 on the Oklahoma nonfiction bestsellers list.

Dvir has launched and is director or the Holocaust, Genocide and Human Rights Education Initiative at Penn State, a partnership with the Pennsylvania Department of Education to provide K-12 teachers with the material and skills to teach difficult topics.

Dvir and other Initiative members and graduate students presented early versions of the Initiative’s instructional material at the Holocaust Center of Pittsburgh’s summer 2019 teacher training. The material accompanies Dvir’s post-Holocaust documentaries, “Cojot” and “A Wing and a Prayer.” Dvir created the Initiative to produce teaching tools and training to empower educators and students to tackle the tough topics.

Dvir has also published various essays through multiple publications, including his Times of Israel blog. Some of his essays include: 
“World War II veterans offer pearls of wisdom” (Sept 2015) 
“Tree of Life first anniversary: How to teach tough topics to out kids” (October 2019)  
“In the wake of Tree of Life, education must be a priority” Post Gazette (Nov 2019)   
“The Obama policy Trump is thrilled to continue (Nov 2019) 
“Op-ed: In terrorism fight, Trump copied Obama” (Jan 2020) 
“Remembering my Savta, an Auschwitz survivor” (Jan 2020) 
“Biden and Trump Agree on strong US-Israel relations-Bernie, not so much” (March 2020)
“Reopening’s Repercussions Reverberate” (May 2020) 
“White House to display Times Square-like Stock Ticker” (June 2020) 
“Unmasking the Cool Factor” (July 2020) 
“The Elusive Endpoint” (Sep 2020)  
“Trump Sues to Prevent 2021 Election Vote Counting” (Nov 2020)

Filmography

References

External links

Living people
1967 births
University of Florida alumni
University of Florida faculty
Pennsylvania State University faculty
Israeli soldiers
People from Petah Tikva
Israeli expatriates in the United States
Israeli documentary filmmakers
American documentary filmmakers
Israeli journalists
American male journalists